The New School Teacher is a 1924 American silent comedy film directed by Gregory La Cava and starring Charles 'Chic' Sale, Doris Kenyon and Mickey Bennett. It was based on short stories by Irvin S. Cobb, and distributed by Associated Exhibitors.

Synopsis
A new absent-minded schoolteacher arrives in a small town, but rapidly becomes a laughing stocky due to the antics of his pupils. However, he proves himself to be a hero when the school building is set on fire by an escaped arsonist.

Main cast
Charles 'Chic' Sale as Professor Timmons
Doris Kenyon as Diana Pope
Mickey Bennett as Philander Pope
Russell Griffin as Waldo Pope
Robert Bentley as Diana's Fiancé
Harlan Knight as Pupil

References

External links

1924 comedy films
1920s English-language films
American silent feature films
Silent American comedy films
Films directed by Gregory La Cava
Associated Exhibitors films
1920s American films